The Authentic Labor Front is a confederation of labor unions in Mexico. It was formed as a progressive "Social Catholic" organization in 1960 in response to the nation's labor strife of 1958-1959. Following the strikes of these years, the Mexican government replaced the leaders of the rebellious mine, railroad and oil workers' unions with charros (corrupt labor bosses). The FAT supported union democracy and opposed the authoritarian tendencies of the ruling Institutional Revolutionary Party (PRI). FAT activists have also challenged the mainstream Confederation of Mexican Workers (CTM).

The FAT was influenced by the student movements of the late 1960s and the Tlatelolco Massacre of 1968. In the following years, the FAT's political orientation became more left-wing and secular. It engaged in the rank-and-file union reform campaigns of the 1970s and 1980s that occurred in the steelworkers, auto workers, and electrical workers unions.

Following the implementation of the North American Free Trade Agreement (NAFTA) in 1994, the FAT became one of the main organizations to oppose it. The FAT has participated in international "cross-border solidarity" campaigns with other unions such as the United Electrical Workers of the United States and the United Steelworkers in the United States and Canada. It has also engaged in other social justice initiatives, such as campaigns around women's rights. Though independent from any political party, the FAT tends to side with the center-left National Regeneration Movement (MORENA).

External links

 Official web site
 UE-FAT web site

Further reading
 History of the FAT (MS Word, English, from the FAT website)
Hathaway, Dale, Allies Across the Border: Mexico's "Authentic Labor Front" and Global Solidarity, South End Press, 2000, hardcover, ; paperback, 

National trade union centers of Mexico
Trade unions established in 1960
1960 establishments in Mexico